Baqubah (BGN: Ba‘qūbah; also spelled Baquba and Baqouba) is the capital of Iraq's Diyala Governorate. In 2003 it had an estimated population of some 467,900 people.
 
Baqubah served as a way station between Baghdad and Khorasan on the medieval Khorasan Road. During the Abbasid Caliphate, it was known for its date and fruit orchards, irrigated by the Nahrawan Canal. It is now known as the centre of Iraq's commercial orange groves.

Demography and ethnography

Demographic composition of Baqubah has been a shifting phenomenon since the independence of Iraq. Consequently, the city served as a springboard for violence against the Shias in Baghdad and others, from 2003 to 2008 (see below for chronological detail). Then in 2014, it became a seat for the ISIS terrorists, raining violence against the Shia population once again. Following these events, the Iraqi Shia militias such as the Kata'ib Hezbollah, have exacted revenge on the Sunni population of the city and the countryside around it alike by killing thousands of families and forced migration and conversions. A stream of Shia settlers are arriving (or being directed to) settle in Baqubah and the neighborhood, in order to avoid a future repeat of the same by the Sunni majority. Both the western and eastern halves of the city straddling the Diyala River have now obtained large and grow Shia minorities, with the eastern half outpacing the other in this respect.

History
Baqubah's name originates from the Aramaic words "Bet" (house) and "Yaqub" (Jacob) and means "Jacob's house". The city was used as a refugee camp for Assyrian refugees fleeing the Assyrian genocide. A refugee camp was set up outside the city, which accommodated between 40,000 and 50,000 refugees.

Medieval history
Baqubah was probably founded during the Sasanian period.

At the time of the Abbasid caliphate, Baqubah lay on the Nahrawan canal, at the end of the canal's Great Qātūl stage and the beginning of its Tāmarrā stage. Although the main road heading east to Khorasan from Baghdad bypassed Baqubah during this period, passing instead through the city of Jisr Nahrawan, it was Baqubah and not Jisr Nahrawan that was the capital of the Upper Nahrawan district.

However, the succeeding Seljuk sultans neglected to dredge the Nahrawan canal or otherwise maintain it, and by the time of Yaqut al-Hamawi in the early 1200s, the canal had completely silted up and the lands it had once watered had gone out of cultivation. By the 14th century, Hamdallah Mustawfi wrote that Jisr Nahrawan was in ruins, and the road to Khorasan now passed through Baqubah instead. Baqubah was the main town in the Tarīq-i-Khurāsān district, and it was surrounded by fertile orchards that produced large crops of oranges and pomelos.

In Yaqut's time, Baqubah was a flourishing town, with several public baths and mosques, as well as a market. The land around Baqubah was densely covered in irrigated orchards, whose dates and lemons were proverbial for their excellence.

Modern history
In the early 1800s, Baqubah was surrounded by date palm groves, as well as orchards producing lemons, pomegranates, and other fruits. In 1820, Baqubah is described as being home to 2,000 people, of whom almost half were Shi'ite. It had a bazaar and two small mosques.<ref>Buckingham, J.S. (1830). 1:15. Travels in Assyria, Media, and Persia'. 2 volumes. London.'</ref>

In the early 1820s, though, the Kurdish army of Mohammad Ali Mirza, governor of Kermanshah, occupied Baqubah and destroyed much of it. A decade later, it was still in ruins. By 1845, the bazaar and one of the mosques were functioning again, and local agriculture was flourishing. By the early 1870s, the Ottoman civil administration had managed to restore stability to the region, and Baqubah became increasingly prosperous. Around the turn of the century, one European traveler described its connections to emerging networks of world commerce:

Recent history
During the course of the US-led occupation of Iraq, Baquba emerged as the scene of some of the heaviest guerrilla activity, along with the Sunni enclaves of Fallujah and Ramadi. It was the site of the heaviest fighting during the June 24, 2004, insurgent offensive. Al-Tawhid Wal-Jihad, led by Abu Musab al-Zarqawi, took responsibility for the attacks.

During late 2006, however, Baqubah and much of Diyala Governorate were reported to have come under Sunni insurgent control. On January 3, 2007 the previous Iraqi government in Baquba was reported to have fallen, leaving the city in the hands of insurgents fighting against the American led coalition in Operation Iraqi Freedom.

In January 2007, it was reported that Sunni insurgents were able to kidnap the mayor and blow up his office, despite promises from American and Iraqi military officials that the situation in the city was "reassuring and under control". The city at its peak had over 460,000 residents, but a February 2007 report labeled the city a "ghost town" as residents either fled criminal and sectarian violence or remained in hiding at home.

On August 10, 2015 a suicide car bombing near Baqubah killed 30 and wounded 40 people. ISIS claimed responsibility for the attack.

Attacks during Iraq War
The following is a list of deadly attacks in the city including the death of al-Zarqawi and after.
 July 9, 2003, SFC Dan "Gabe" Gabrielson of the 652nd Engineer Company (MRBC) was killed in an insurgent ambush.
July 26, 2003 SPC Jonathan Barnes, SGT Daniel Methvin, and SPC Wilfredo Perez were killed and another soldier was critically injured in a grenade attack from inside the Baqubah women and children's hospital they were guarding at the time.
 August 11, 2003 SSG David Perry of the 649th MP Company was killed while inspecting a suspicious package outside Diyala Provincial Police Headquarters. The package was an Improvised Explosive Device (IED) in disguise.  The 649th MPs were living at the police station and training Iraqi Police
 November 20, 2003 Capt. George Wood was killed in action while on patrol in Baqubah, Iraq when his vehicle hit an explosive.
 December 25, 2003, SSG Thomas Christensen and SSG Stephen Hattamer, of the 652nd Engineer Company (MRBC), were killed in a mortar attack on Camp Gabe on the outskirts of Baqubah.
 December 26, 2003, Ssgt Michael Sutter, of 745th Ordinance Company of 79th Ord Battalion died while disarming two IEDs along the Diyalah canal, near Baqubah Police Hq garrisoned by the 649th MP company who were instrumental in the recovery of the soldier several days later.
 March 10, 2004, SPC Bert Hoyer, of the 652nd Engineer Company (MRBC) was killed by an IED outside Camp Warhorse.

June 24, 2004, Capt. Christopher Cash and Spec.4 Daniel Desens Jr, of A Co 1-120th INF BN, North Carolina National Guard, were killed in action during attacks by a large well-coordinated insurgent force attempting to take key points around the city.

 April 8–13, 2004: Mahdi Militia attempt to overtake the city. American tanks and Bradleys patrol the streets and Artillery and Air Force bombs dropped inside the city limits.
June 8, 2004. United States Army Captain Humayun Khan ran towards a taxi that was speedily approaching the guard post he was inspecting. Its driver detonated a bomb before the taxi could hit the post or a nearby mess hall, where hundreds of soldiers were eating breakfast. Khan was posthumously awarded the Bronze Star and Purple Heart.
 June 7, 2006: A U.S. airstrike kills Abu Musab al-Zarqawi, the former leader of Al-Qaeda in Iraq, near Baqubah, northeast of Baghdad.
 June 26, 2006: At least 25 people are killed in a bicycle bombing in the city, according to police.
 October 3, 2006: In a string of deadly attacks, gunmen open fire on a Shia family fleeing the city, killing five of them. Ten others are killed in shooting and bombing incidents, and 10 bodies are found in the city, the apparent victims of sectarian slayings.
 October 26, 2006: Insurgents ambush a police unit, killing 24 policemen and one civilian. Eight insurgents are killed in subsequent fighting with police and U.S. troops, the military says.
 November 12, 2006: Fifty bodies are found dumped behind the offices of the provincial electric company, according to the Iraqi army's provincial public affairs office.
 November 29, 2006: Fighting between police and insurgents after an attack on Baqubah's police headquarters shuts down the city, closing the university, schools and most stores, and clearing the streets of everyone, except a few who scurry about to stock up on food. At least 55 militants are killed in clashes in the preceding days, according to anonymous police sources.
 November 30, 2006: The U.S. military says Iraqi forces find 28 bodies in a mass grave south of Baqubah, following days of heavy fighting that killed scores of people in and around the city.
 December 2, 2006: U.S. and Iraqi forces begin an offensive in the city in response to fighting that raged for a week between Sunni insurgents and police. Ahmed Fuad, a senior morgue official, said the morgue received 102 bodies in the previous two weeks.
 December 3, 2006: Some 16 bodies – apparent victims of sectarian death squads – are found.
 December 29, 2006: Ten bodies showing signs of torture are found dumped on the streets of the city, police and morgue officials say. 
 August 6, 2007: A bomb detonates in a house, killing 3 US soldiers, 1 of whom was Kareem Rashad Sultan Khan.
 June 22, 2008: A female suicide bomber detonated a powerful explosive device outside a government outpost and courthouse. 15 were killed in the blast.
 July 15, 2008: Two suicide bombers target army recruits, killing 35 and injuring 50. See: 15 July 2008 Baquba bombings
 October 8, 2008: A female suicide bomber detonates at the central court house, killing nine (including five Iraqi soldiers) and wounding 17.
 October 16, 2008: A mortar attack occurred. Three rockets fired into FOB (Forward operating base) Warhorse from nearby Baqubah kill 2 US Army soldiers, PFC Cody J. Eggleston, and PFC Heath K. Pickard. Both were awarded the Alaska Decoration of Honor. They both were assigned to 1st Platoon, C-CO, 1st Battalion, 5th Infantry Regiment, 1st Brigade Combat Team, 25th Infantry Division, Fort Wainwright, Alaska.
 March 3, 2010: Suicide attacks killed at least 31 people and injured dozens more in three separate suicide bombings. The third explosion attacked the city's main hospital, where the victims of the first two attacks were being treated.
 June 14, 2011: A team of six gunmen and suicide bombers dressed in police uniforms attacked Diyala provincial council's offices in the center of Baqubah. The assault began about 9:20 a.m. with a suicide car bomb attack at the gates of the Diyala provincial council's headquarters. As police officers and Iraq Security Forces (advised by US Army Special Forces) rushed to the scene, other militants attacked a second checkpoint, one detonating a suicide vest and the others spraying guards and civilians with gunfire. Four civilians and three police officers reported killed. Five of the attackers were also killed, and one was captured.

Operation Arrowhead Ripper

On June 19, 2007, U.S. forces launched a large-scale operation against Iraqi militants in Baquba. The offensive, Operation Arrowhead Ripper, involved approximately 10,000 coalition soldiers.

Lingering legacy of Ba'ath Party and Saddam Hussein
Along with the city of Fallujah, Baqubah has kept the names of monuments and mosques named after some of the most controversial officers and campaigns of the Baath Party. For example, still today, a large mosque named after Adnan Khairallah is found in the city. There is also an Izzat Ibrahim mosque in Baqubah (and another one in its satellite town of Buhriz), named likewise after a high officer of Saddam Hussein. Furthermore, Baqubah also hosts a mosque named the Anfal mosque, which echoes the name of the Anfal Campaign, which involved the mass killing of the Kurds under the supervision of Adnan Khairallah.  These, like other Baath Party-related names, are controversial among Iraqi Shia and Kurds who lost so many lives to the abuses of the Ba'ath Party, Saddam Hussein and military/security figures like Adnan Khairallah and Izzat Ibrahim.

Climate
Baqubah has a hot desert climate (BWh'') in the Köppen–Geiger climate classification system. In winter there is more rainfall than in summer. About  of precipitation falls annually.

Transport
Baqubah is connected by highway to Baghdad and Mandali.

See also
 List of places in Iraq
 2004 Baqubah bombing
 Al Ba'quba Stadium
 Eshnunna
 Sand Castle (film)

References

Further reading 
  A 2007 OEF campaign account by a first sergeant of B Company 1-12 Cavalry (Bonecrushers), 1st Cavalry Division, out of Fort Hood, Texas.

External links
 Iraq Image – Baqubah Satellite Observation
 Text, Videos, and pictures from the front lines and during food distribution.

Populated places in Diyala Province
Populated places along the Silk Road
Assyrian communities in Iraq
District capitals of Iraq
Cities in Iraq